The 1957 Ohio Bobcats football team was an American football team that represented Ohio University in the Mid-American Conference (MAC) during the 1957 NCAA University Division football season. In their ninth and final season under head coach Carroll Widdoes, the Bobcats compiled a 2–6–1 record (1–4–1 against MAC opponents), finished in a tie for fifth place in the MAC, and were outscored by all opponents by a combined total of 156 to 134.  They played their home games in Peden Stadium in Athens, Ohio.

Schedule

References

Ohio
Ohio Bobcats football seasons
Ohio Bobcats football